Marjorie Ann Critten of Kansas City, Missouri, was Miss Missouri in 1958. She competed at the Miss America 1959 pageant in Atlantic City, New Jersey.

References

Living people
Miss America 1950s delegates
People from Kansas City, Missouri
Year of birth missing (living people)